Lodekka is the London-based project of multi-instrumental musician and graphic designer Stuart Dace, signed to the independent British record label, Freshly Squeezed. Named after the Bristol Lodekka bus, Lodekka's music is a fusion of funk, electronic and soul music.

Discography

Albums
 2011: Long Player

Extended plays
 2007: ZESTEP016
 2009: The Get On EP

References

Musical groups from London
Musical groups established in 2007